James Hunter Ross (10 February 1788 – 18 September 1865) was a lawyer and politician in colonial Victoria, Australia.

Ross was born at Prestonpans, East Lothian, Scotland, the son of Major John Ross and Jean Buchan.

Ross practised as a lawyer at the Supreme Court in Scotland. He arrived in the Port Phillip District in August 1841. In 1841, Ross founded the law firm Blake & Riggall, the forerunner of Ashurst Australia.

On 31 October 1851 Griffith was nominated, 
being sworn-in the following month, to the Victorian Legislative Council, 
a position he held until resigning July 1852. He was replaced in the council by Thomas Turner à Beckett.

References

 

1788 births
1865 deaths
Members of the Victorian Legislative Council
Scottish emigrants to Australia
19th-century Australian politicians